Theodore Michael Vincent (born August 10, 1956) is a former American football defensive tackle who played three seasons in the National Football League with the Cincinnati Bengals and San Francisco 49ers. He was drafted by the Bengals in the third round of the 1978 NFL Draft. He played college football at Wichita State University.

References

External links
Just Sports Stats

Living people
1956 births
African-American players of American football
American football defensive tackles
Cincinnati Bengals players
People from O'Fallon, Missouri
Players of American football from Missouri
San Francisco 49ers players
Sportspeople from Greater St. Louis
Wichita State Shockers football players
21st-century African-American people
20th-century African-American sportspeople